Fairmount is an unincorporated community and a census-designated place (CDP) in Jefferson County, Colorado, United States. The CDP is a part of the Denver–Aurora–Lakewood, CO Metropolitan Statistical Area. The population of the Fairmount CDP was 7,559 at the United States Census 2010. ZIP code 80403 applies to addresses in Fairmount.

Geography
Fairmount is bordered to the north by Arvada, to the east by Wheat Ridge, to the south by unincorporated Applewood, and to the west by Golden and undeveloped land on North Table Mountain.

The southeast corner of the Fairmount CDP touches Interstate 70, which leads east  into Denver.

Demographics

Education
Fairmount is served by the Jefferson County Public Schools.

See also

Outline of Colorado
Index of Colorado-related articles
State of Colorado
Colorado cities and towns
Colorado census designated places
Colorado counties
Jefferson County, Colorado
Colorado metropolitan areas
Front Range Urban Corridor
North Central Colorado Urban Area
Denver-Aurora-Boulder, CO Combined Statistical Area
Denver-Aurora-Broomfield, CO Metropolitan Statistical Area

References

External links

Fairmount Fire Protection District
Prospect Recreation & Park District
Jefferson County website
Jeffco Public Schools

Census-designated places in Jefferson County, Colorado
Census-designated places in Colorado
Denver metropolitan area